Yuan Shu (died July or August 199), courtesy name Gonglu, was a Chinese military general, politician, and warlord who lived during the late Eastern Han dynasty. He rose to prominence following the collapse of the Han central government in 189. He declared himself Emperor of China in 197 under the short-lived Zhong dynasty, two years before his death in 199.

Life

Early life
Yuan Shu was from Ruyang County, Runan Commandery, which is in present-day Shangshui County, Henan. His family had for over four generations been a prominent force in the Han civil service, having produced numerous members in high positions since the first century CE. Descended from Yuan An, who served during the reign of Emperor Zhang, Yuan Shu was a son of the Minister of Works Yuan Feng and his principal wife. Yuan Shu is sometimes described to be a younger cousin of the warlord Yuan Shao, but was actually Yuan Shao's younger half-brother.

As a young man he gained a reputation for gallantry and liked to go hunting with dogs and falcons. Nominated as Filial and Incorrupt, he later became Intendant of Henan and then General of the Household Rapid as a Tiger.

Campaign against Dong Zhuo (189–191) 

After the death of General-in-Chief He Jin (22 September 189), Yuan Shu, as the Imperial Corps Commander of the Imperial Tiger Guards, led his men to kill the eunuch faction. When Dong Zhuo seized control of the Han central government, he wanted to appoint Yuan Shu as General of the Rear, but, fearing Dong Zhuo, Yuan Shu fled to Nanyang Commandery, which he took control over after Sun Jian killed its grand administrator, Zhang Zi.

Yuan Shu participated in the Campaign against Dong Zhuo led by Yuan Shao. He was joined by Sun Jian, whom he appointed to Inspector of Yu Province. Sun Jian succeeded in defeating and killing Dong's general Hua Xiong (191), but Yuan Shu grew wary that Sun would become too successful and no longer submit to his command, and temporarily secretly cut off Sun's food supplies, thereby hindering his advance. By the time Sun Jian reached Luoyang, it had been largely destroyed by fires set by Dong Zhuo, whose forces fled westwards to Chang'an, abducting the emperor. However, his soldiers found the Imperial Seal, which Sun Jian passed to his superior Yuan Shu.

Rule in Nanyang and Chenliu (190–193) 
Yuan Shu's rule in Nanyang was despotic. After the dissension of the alliance against Dong Zhuo in 191, he vied with Yuan Shao over control of northern China, each establishing opposing alliances. Yuan Shu allied with Yuan Shao's northern rival Gongsun Zan, and Yuan Shao in turn allied with Yuan Shu's southern rival Liu Biao. Yuan Shu sent Sun Jian to attack Liu Biao, but his general was killed in the Battle of Xiangyang (191). Sun Jian's nephew Sun Ben succeeded him as Yuan Shu's general and Inspector of Yu Province. After this defeat and his unpopularity due to his extravagant regime in Nanyang, Yuan Shu moved his residence to Chenliu, and extended his influence into Yang Province in 192.

Warlord in Shouchun (193–197) 

In early 193, Yuan Shu suffered repeated defeats, such as the Battle of Fengqiu, by the combined armies of Cao Cao and Yuan Shao. He fled to Shouchun in Jiujiang on the southern bank of the Huai River. From his new headquarters, he built up a powerful warlord state. He deposed Inspector Chen Wen of Yang Province and took the title for himself, also claiming to be Lord of Xu Province.

From 194 to early 197, Sun Jian's son Sun Ce and brother-in-law Wu Jing conquered many territories in Jiangdong on Yuan Shu's behalf. He was less successful in expanding his rule in Xu Province, where he fought against Liu Bei and Lü Bu; the latter briefly allied himself to Yuan Shu in 196, but betrayed him again and drove him back to Shouchun.

Emperor of Zhongshi Dynasty (197–199) 

Yuan Shu declared himself emperor under the short-lived Zhongshi dynasty in early 197, citing superstition as his justification, including the Chinese characters for his given name Shu and courtesy name Gonglu, and his possession of the Imperial Seal, which was given to him by the late Sun Jian. This audacious action made him a target of the other warlords. His extravagant lifestyle and arrogance caused many of his followers to desert him. Most devastating of the departures and defections – both to Yuan Shu personally and to the strength of his forces – was that by Sun Ce, who had conquered most of the Jiangdong territories under Yuan Shu's banner. Following crushing defeats by the armies of Cao Cao, Liu Bei, and Lü Bu, Yuan Shu attempted to flee north to join Yuan Shao. Yuan Shao sent his eldest son, Yuan Tan, to try to aid Yuan Shu; however, an alliance between the Yuan brothers who had long hated each other would not arise, as Yuan Tan arrived too late, and Yuan Shu's forces were blocked and forced to retreat back to Shouchun by Liu Bei. He died shortly thereafter of starvation, being unable to swallow the coarse food that his soldiers ate. His final request was for a glass of honey water, which his soldiers had none.

Family 
 Grandfather: Yuan Tang
 Father: Yuan Feng
 Siblings:
 Yuan Shao, elder half-brother
 Cousins:
 Yuan Yi, elder cousin
 Yuan Yin, younger cousin
 Spouse: Lady Feng, daughter of Feng Fang
 Children:
 Yuan Yao, son. After Yuan Shu's death, Yuan Yao and his family fled to Lujiang Commandery to join the minor warlord Liu Xun. After Sun Ce defeated Liu Xun and conquered Lujiang Commandery, Yuan Yao was captured and eventually worked as a Palace Gentleman in the state of Sun Quan's (Sun Ce's younger brother) state of Eastern Wu. Yuan Yao's daughter married Sun Fen, the fifth son of Sun Quan.
 Lady Yuan, daughter, personal name unknown, became one of Sun Quan's concubines after she and her brother were captured. She was known for good character but did not give birth. Sun Quan let her raise children which were born by other concubines, however, all the children that she raised died at early ages. When Lady Bu died in 238, Sun Quan wanted to instate Lady Yuan as the empress. Lady Yuan refused with the reason of having no child.
 Lady Yuan, daughter, personal name unknown, married Huang Yi
 Relatives:
 Yuan Wei, uncle
 Yang Biao, brother-in-law
 He Kui, distant cousin

See also
 Lists of people of the Three Kingdoms
 Campaign against Yuan Shu

Notes

References

Citations

Bibliography
 Chen, Shou (3rd century). Records of the Three Kingdoms (Sanguozhi).
 
 Fan, Ye (5th century). Book of the Later Han (Houhanshu).
 Sima, Guang (1084). Zizhi Tongjian.

199 deaths
2nd-century births
Han dynasty generals from Henan
Han dynasty politicians from Henan
Han dynasty warlords
Political office-holders in Anhui
Politicians from Zhoukou
Year of birth unknown